Rebecca Louise "Bex" Chilcott, known professionally as Ruby Boots, (born October 20, 1981) is an Australian singer-songwriter who sings country and americana music.

Early life and education 
Boots was born in Perth, Western Australia, and lived in the suburbs of Balga and Girrawheen. She is of Scottish and Italian descent.

At the age of 13 years old, Boots moved out of her mother's house, then lived with her father and various friends before living independently at the age of 16 years old.

After spending time in Perth, Boots got work in the pearl farms located north of Perth in Broome and Exmouth. She did this for a few years.

Boots studied Basic Music Industry Skills at TAFE WA North Metropolitan, where she received a Diploma of Music Business. In 2014, she also completed The Seed Fund's Management Workshop.

Career 
In 2015, Boots released her first album, Solitude, on Lost Highway Records Australia, an imprint of Universal Music Australia. Boots collaborated with many musicians on her debut record. She co-wrote two songs, "Middle of Nowhere" and "No Stranger" with Vikki Thorn from The Waifs, the title track, "Solitude," with Davey Lane from You Am I. Alt-country musician Jordie Lane provided vocals on the duet "Lovin' in the Fall," and Bill Chambers appears on the song, "Walk Away." The record was recorded in Sydney, Melbourne, Perth, Spain and Utah.

Boots began writing the songs in 2012, then recorded the record in 2013, and then mixed it in 2014. The record received overall positive reviews.

In 2016, Boots played at the Americana Music Association's AmericanaFest, where she signed a distribution deal with Bloodshot Records. She returned to AmericanaFest 2017 as part of the Bloodshot Records annual showcase.

In 2018, Boots released her second full length record called Don't Talk About It on Bloodshot Records. She wrote one song, which is sung a cappella, called "I Am a Woman" with Nashville-based musician Nikki Lane. The record was produced by Beau Bedford and The Texas Gentlemen were the session band and was recorded in Dallas at Modern Electric Sound Recorders.

In North America and Western Europe, Bloodshot Records is the U.S.-based distributor. Island Records / Universal is the distributor across Australia, New Zealand, and through subsidiaries Eastern Europe, Asia, and beyond.

Personal life 
Boots has said that her pen name, Ruby Boots, comes from the idea of being fiery and passionate (Ruby) and from the ideas of a wayfaring troubadour, a musician that travels around a lot, with boots implying moving around (Boots).

Boots had vocal nodules, which she worked to remove using non-surgical methods. It required a three-year break from singing, during which time she took classes and ran local open mics.

In 2016, Boots relocated to the United States, and now lives in Nashville, Tennessee.

Discography

Studio albums

Extended plays

Singles

Awards and nominations

National Live Music Awards
The National Live Music Awards (NLMAs) are a broad recognition of Australia's diverse live industry, celebrating the success of the Australian live scene. The awards commenced in 2016.

|-
| National Live Music Awards of 2016
| Ruby Boots
| Live Roots Act of the Year
| 
|-
|  National Live Music Awards of 2017
| Ruby Boots
| Live Roots Act of the Year
|

WAM Song of the Year
The WAM Song of the Year was formed by the  Western Australian Rock Music Industry Association Inc. (WARMIA) in 1985, with its main aim to develop and run annual awards recognising achievements within the music industry in Western Australia.

 (wins only)
|-
| 2014
| "Wrap Me in a Fever"
| Country Song of the Year
| 
|-

West Australian Music Industry Awards
The Western Australian Music Industry Awards (commonly known as WAMis) are annual awards presented to the local contemporary music industry, put on by the Western Australian Music Industry Association Inc (WAM). 

|-
| rowspan="2"| 2011
| rowspan="2"| Ruby Boots
| Best Blues & Roots Act
| 
|-
| Best Country Music Act
| 
|-
| rowspan="3"| 2012
| rowspan="3"| Ruby Boots
| Acoustic Roots Act of the Year
| 
|-
| Folk Act of the Year
| 
|-
| Country Music Act of the Year 
| 
|-
| rowspan="2"| 2013
| rowspan="2"| Ruby Boots
| Country Music Act of the Year
| 
|-
| Solo Artist of the Year
| 
|-
| 2014
| Ruby Boots
| Country Music Act of the Year
| 
|-
|-
| 2015
| Ruby Boots
| Country Music Act of the Year
| 
|-
| 2016
| Ruby Boots
| Country Music Act of the Year
| 
|-

References

External links 

 https://t.me/ruby_boots
 Ruby Boots at Bloodshot Records

1981 births
Living people
Musicians from Perth, Western Australia
Bloodshot Records artists
Island Records artists